Suzanne Schulting (born 25 September 1997) is a Dutch short track speed skater who is also active as a long track speed skater. At the 2018 Winter Olympics, she won the Netherlands' first-ever gold medal in short track speed skating and became one of the youngest-ever Dutch Winter Olympic champions. She is also a two-time overall World Champion (2019, 2021) and three-time overall European Champion (2019, 2020, 2021), and the current world record holder for 1000m.

Biography
Schulting took up short track speed skating when she was eight years old in Thialf, Heerenveen. She won a gold medal in the 1500m event at the 2016 World Junior Championships in Sofia.

At the 2018 Winter Olympics, she won a bronze medal in the 3000m relay and a gold medal in the 1000m. This was the first time the Netherlands had ever won a gold medal in short track speed skating. At just 20 years old, she became the second youngest Dutch Olympic gold medalist in any discipline at a Winter Olympics. In December 2018, she was named the Dutch Sportswoman of the Year.

During the 2018–19 season, she finished first overall at the 2019 European Championships and 2019 World Championships. The following season, Schulting successfully defended her title at the 2020 European Championships, while the World Championships in Seoul was canceled due to the COVID-19 pandemic. Schulting was once again crowned overall champion after winning every single race she started in at both the 2021 European Championships and 2021 World Championships, though many prominent countries didn't attend or boycotted the latter for various reasons, including the COVID-19 pandemic. 

Schulting competed for Netherlands in short track speed skating at the 2022 Beijing Olympic Winter Games in February 2022, winning gold in the 1000 metres as well as the 3000 metre relay, setting a new world and Olympic record for the 1000 metres during the quarterfinal. She also won a silver medal in the 500 metres, setting a new Olympic record during the heats, and a bronze in the 1500 metres. 

Schulting did not compete at the 2022 World Championships in Montreal after testing positive for COVID-19. 

Schulting studies at the Dutch Language Institute (NTI) in Leiden.

Personal records

Tournament overview: long track speed skating

Source:

References

External links
 
 

1997 births
Living people
Dutch female short track speed skaters
Olympic short track speed skaters of the Netherlands
Olympic gold medalists for the Netherlands
Olympic silver medalists for the Netherlands
Olympic bronze medalists for the Netherlands
Olympic medalists in short track speed skating
Short track speed skaters at the 2018 Winter Olympics
Short track speed skaters at the 2022 Winter Olympics
Medalists at the 2018 Winter Olympics
Medalists at the 2022 Winter Olympics
Speed skaters at the 2012 Winter Youth Olympics
World Short Track Speed Skating Championships medalists
Sportspeople from Groningen (city)
20th-century Dutch women
20th-century Dutch people
21st-century Dutch women